The participation of Singapore in the ABU TV Song Festival has occurred twice since the inaugural ABU TV Song Festival began in 2012. Since their début in 2012, the Singapore entry has been organised by the national broadcaster MediaCorp Suria. In 2014, Singapore withdrew from the festival.

History
MediaCorp Suria is one of the founder members in the ABU TV Song Festivals, having participated in the very first ABU TV Song Festival 2012.

Withdrawal
Singapore was not present on the final participation list that was published by the ABU. The reasons for withdrawal from the ABU TV Song Festival 2014 are unknown.

Participation overview

See also 
 Singapore in the ABU Radio Song Festival

References 

Countries at the ABU Song Festival